Shah Nurul Kabir is a Bangladesh Nationalist Party politician and the former Member of Parliament of Mymensingh-8.

Career
Kabir was elected to parliament from Mymensingh-8 as a Bangladesh Nationalist Party candidate in 2001. He is the Convener of Ishwarganj Upazila unit of Bangladesh Nationalist Party. On 9 October 2018, he was arrested under Special Powers Act.

References

Bangladesh Nationalist Party politicians
Living people
7th Jatiya Sangsad members
Year of birth missing (living people)